"She Was My Baby (He Was My Friend)" is a song written by Joy Byers and originally recorded by Jerry Lee Lewis, who released it as a single, with "The Hole He Said He'd Dig for Me" on the other side, in 1964 on Smash Records.

Track listing

Charts

References 

1964 songs
1964 singles
Jerry Lee Lewis songs
Smash Records singles
Rock-and-roll songs